CREB-regulated transcription coactivator 3 is a protein that in humans is encoded by the CRTC3 gene.

This gene has been shown to be linked to weight gain.

References

Further reading

External links 
 
 

Gene expression
Transcription coregulators